Persephone is a Greek goddess. Her Roman equivalent is Proserpina.

Persephone may also refer to:

Given name
 Persephone Borrow, English immunologist
 Persephone Swales-Dawson (born 1997), British television actress

Science

Planetary science
 399 Persephone, an asteroid
 Planet Persephone, a conjectured name for a planet beyond Pluto (see also #Science fiction, below)
 As such, an early proposed name for Eris (dwarf planet) and Charon (moon)
 Alternate name for Planet Nine
 Persephone (spacecraft), a proposed orbiter mission to the Pluto system as a follow up to New Horizons

Zoology
Anthophorula persephone, an extinct species of bee
Rhadine persephone, a species of beetle
Betta persephone, a species of betta fish
Chazara persephone, a species of butterfly
Prodryas persephone, an extinct species of butterfly
Aeshna persephone, a species of dragonfly
Eilema persephone, a species of moth
Catoptria persephone, a species of moth
Stygioides persephone, a species of moth
Hypercompe persephone, a species of moth
Volutomitra persephone, a species of sea snail
Petrogale persephone, a species of Rock-wallaby
Amphisbaena persephone, a species of worm lizard

Media

Fictional characters
 Persephone (The Matrix), a fictional character in the Matrix film trilogy
 Persephone or Rachel Blake, a character in The Lost Experience
 Persephone, a character in Jeff Noon's novel Pollen
 Persephone, a character in Stripperella
 Persephone, the Goddess of Life in the computer game Sacrifice
 Persephone, a character in Herc's Adventures
 Persephone "Sephy" Hadley, main character in the Noughts & Crosses series of novels by Malorie Blackman
 Persephone, an Amazon in Wonder Woman (film)
 Persephone, the daughter of Admiral Lockwood, and object of Commander Kydd's affections, in the book The Admiral's Daughter
 Persephone, a Fairy character who sells upgrades in the Activision computer game Skylanders: Spyro's Adventure (game)
 Persephone "Persie" Towyn, sister of Lady Agnes Holland in the BBC TV Series Upstairs Downstairs
 Persephone, a nickname of Eo of Lykos from Red Rising by Pierce Brown.

Science fiction
 The name of a planet beyond Pluto in several science fiction works (see #Astronomy above)
 Persephone, a planet in the television series Firefly

Music
 Persephone (instrument), an electronic fingerboard synthesizer
 Perséphone (Stravinsky), a 1934 musical work by Stravinsky
 Persefone, a metal band from Andorra
 Persephone (band), see :de:Persephone (Band)
 "Persephone", a song by Dead Can Dance from Within the Realm of a Dying Sun
 "Persephone", a song by Cocteau Twins from Treasure
 "Persephone", a song by Wishbone Ash from There's the Rub
 "Persephone", a song by Opeth from Sorceress
 "Perséphone", a song by Year of No Light from Ausserwelt

Painting
 Persephone (painting), a 1939 painting by Thomas Hart Benton

Other uses
 Persephone (tugboat), a salvage ship in The Beachcombers
 Persephone Books, a British publisher

See also
 Persephone in popular culture
 Persophone, a speaker of the Persian language
Persephone (given name)
 Proserpina (disambiguation)